White Signal is a census-designated place in Grant County, New Mexico, United States. Its population was 181 as of the 2010 census. New Mexico State Road 90 passes through the community.

White Signal was named for a nearby outcropping of reflective white quartz; early residents thought the reflected sunlight resembled a signal. The community had a post office from 1909 to 1933.

Geography

Demographics

References

Census-designated places in New Mexico
Census-designated places in Grant County, New Mexico